The members of the Parliament of Fiji from April to September 1977 consisted of members of the House of Representatives elected between 19 March and 2 April 1977, and members of the nominated Senate.

House of Representatives

Senate

References

 1977 1